Nehru Maidan or Central Maidan is a multi purpose ground in Mangalore, Karnataka, India. This ground is situated in heart of the city Hampankatta. The ground is mainly used for organizing matches of football, cricket and other sports. Also known for many public events organized here such as political rallies, religious festivals, exhibitions.

Nehru Maidan was named after the first Indian Prime Minister, Jawaharlal Nehru.

Nehru Maidan is an important venue hosting domestic tournaments and many inter-school and collegiate tournaments. The Mangalore Sports Club (MSC) is a popular organisation in the city and has been elected as the institutional member for the Mangalore Zone of the Karnataka State Cricket Association (KSCA) which is situated in Nehru Maidan.

Dakshina Kannada Football Association (DKDFA), annually organizes the "Independence Day cup" on the occasion of Independence Day at Nehru Maidan. Various schools and colleges from across Dakshina Kannada, Udupi, Kodagu districts will be participating and the matches are conducted under seven categories.

Sports Events 
 Independence Day cup football  
 Indian Premiere league - Fan park

Other Events 
 Independence Day and Republic Day Parade
 Nehru Maidan's Ganesh Utsav
 Auto Expo

References 

Sport in Mangalore
Football venues in Karnataka
Year of establishment missing
Cricket grounds in Karnataka